Andrew Lynch is an American stand-up comedian known for his 2015 appearance on America's Got Talent, finishing in second place in the finale.

America's Got Talent
Lynch auditioned for the 10th season of America's Got Talent in 2015. After his performance in the live audition, Howie Mandel pressed the Golden Buzzer which sent Lynch straight to the Quarterfinals at Radio City Music Hall. Lynch performed in Week 1 of the Quarterfinals and in Week 1 of the Semifinals and received the public vote to be sent into the Finals. Lynch finished in the Top 5 acts of the competition and eventually placed second behind ventriloquist Paul Zerdin.

YouTube
Lynch has a YouTube channel where he creates content and occasionally streams a show called 'Dog Vlog'. Lynch's videos feature him talking to viewers about his life with his service dog, as well as occasionally using self-deprecation comedy. The channel currently has over 2 million subscribers.

Beginning in December 2017, Lynch has also starred in a flash animation series named Therapy Dog, created with the help of animator Tony Celano. The series is about a character called Andy (Lynch) repeating his daily struggles to Stella playing the role as the therapist.

Albums & Specials
Lynch released his first album, Concussed, to streaming services in November 2021.

Personal life
Lynch suffers from a stutter, a condition he developed after a softball accident that severely damaged his vocal cords.

References

Living people
American stand-up comedians
America's Got Talent contestants
Comedians from Indiana
American people with disabilities
American YouTubers
21st-century American comedians
Year of birth missing (living people)